The 1939 season of the Primera División Peruana, the top category of Peruvian football, was played by 8 teams. The national champions were Universitario. From 1931 until 1942 the points system was W:3, D:2, L:1, walkover:0.

Results

Standings

External links 
 Peru 1939 season at RSSSF
 Peruvian Football League News 

Peru1
Peruvian Primera División seasons
1